Events from the year 1754 in art.

Events
 Society for the encouragement of Arts, Manufactures & Commerce founded in England by William Shipley.
 Joshua Kirby publishes the pamphlet Dr. Brook Taylor's Method of Perspective made Easy both in Theory and Practice in London, containing William Hogarth's Satire on False Perspective.

Paintings

 Canaletto
 English Landscape Capriccio with a Column (National Gallery of Art, Washington D.C.)
 English Landscape Capriccio with a Palace (National Gallery of Art, Washington D.C.)
 Eton College (National Gallery, London)
 London: Interior of the Rotunda at Ranelagh (National Gallery, London)
 Old Walton Bridge (Dulwich Picture Gallery, London)
 St. Paul's Cathedral (Yale Center for British Art, New Haven, Connecticut)
 John Giles Eccardt – Horace Walpole
 William Hogarth – Humours of an Election (four paintings)

Births
 February 5 – Gilles-Louis Chrétien, French musician and creator of the physionotrace used for portraits (died 1811)
 April 12 – Peter Haas, German-Danish engraver (died 1804)
 May 8 – Amos Doolittle, American engraver (died 1832)
 May 10 – Asmus Jacob Carstens, Danish-German neoclassical artist (died 1798)
 May 17 – Antoine Berjon, French painter and designer (died 1843)
 May 26 – Jean-Louis Anselin, French engraver (died 1823)
 May 31 – Andrea Appiani, Milanese neoclassical painter (died 1817)
 August 2 – Pierre Charles L'Enfant, French architect and artist (died 1825)
 October 2 – Françoise-Jeanne Ridderbosch, Belgian painter and engraver (died 1837)
 October 9 – Jean-Baptiste Regnault, French painter (died 1829)
 October 29 – Claude Ramey, French sculptor (died 1838)
 December 20 – Francesco Manno, Italian painter and architect (died 1831)
 date unknown
 Kim Deuk-sin, Korean painter, official painter of the Joseon court (died 1822)
 John Graham, Scottish painter and teacher of art (died 1817)
 Emanuel Granberg, Finnish painter (died 1797)
 Charles Grignion the Younger, British history and portrait painter and engraver (died 1804)
 Ivan Martos, Russian-Ukrainian sculptor and art teacher (died 1835)
 Jean Népomucène Hermann Nast, Austrian-born French porcelain manufacturer (died 1817)
 Victor-Jean Nicolle, French landscape and architecture painter (died 1824)
 Marie-Elisabeth Simons, Belgian painter (died 1774)
 Paul Theodor van Brussel, Dutch flower painter (died 1795)
 Arend Johan van Glinstra, Dutch painter (died 1814)

Deaths
 April 28
 Roland Paradis, French silversmith working in New France (born 1696)
 Giovanni Battista Piazzetta, Italian rococo painter (born 1682)
 May 2 – Thomas Restout, French painter (born 1671)
 May 5 – Giovan Battista Caniana, Italian sculptor and architect (born 1671)
 June 25 - Pierre-Jacques Cazes, French historical painter (born 1676)
 July 5 – Charles-Nicolas Cochin the Elder, French line-engraver (born 1688)
 October 22 – Peter von Bemmel, German landscape painter and etcher (born 1686)
 December 1 – Jean-Joseph Vinache, French sculptor (born 1696)
 date unknown
 Fedor Leontyevich Argunov, Russian painter (born 1716)
 Giovanni Costanzi, Italian gem engraver of the late-Baroque period (born 1674)

 
Years of the 18th century in art
1750s in art